Gibraltar is a town located in Zulia State in Venezuela between Bobures to the south and Boscan to the north. It is on the shore of Maracaibo Lake. The population is around 4,000.

History 
It was founded as San Antonio de Gibraltar in February 1592 by Gonzalo Piña Ludueña and took its name from his home town, the then Spanish Gibraltar (now a British overseas territory). It was, during the colonial period, the most important harbour of the city of Mérida and a major center for the exportation of cocoa.

Gibraltar was taken and ransacked in 1667 by the french pirate François l'Olonnais and two years later by Sir Henry Morgan.  In 1678, Michel de Grammont captured and plundered the small town, penetrating as far inland as Trujillo. The damage was so severe that it had nearly ceased to exist by 1680.

References 

Populated places in Zulia
1592 establishments in the Spanish Empire
Populated places established in 1592